The Hoover Wilderness is a wilderness area in the Inyo and Humboldt-Toiyabe National Forests. It lies to the east of the crest of the central Sierra Nevada in California, to the north and east of Yosemite National Park - a long strip stretching nearly to Sonora Pass on the north and Tioga Pass on the south.

The headwaters of the East Walker River begin in the Hoover Wilderness. It comprises 48,601 acres (197 km2). Many trails lead into it from the east, from Walker Meadow (off the Sonora Pass road), Buckeye Creek, Green Lakes, Virginia Lakes, Lundy Lake, and Saddlebag Lake (off the Tioga Pass road).

The Hoover Wilderness was originally designated as a Primitive Area by the Forest Service in 1931. It was named in honor of President Herbert Hoover. In 1956, it was designated as a Wild Area and became a Wilderness Area when the 1964 Wilderness Act was passed. It was significantly expanded to its present size in 2009.

The Hoover Wilderness was the setting of Camping Adventure, a children's book published in 1976 by the National Geographic Society as part of its "Books for Young Explorers" series.

Places
Notable locations in the Hoover Wilderness include:
 Twenty Lakes Basin, above Saddlebag Lake 
 Virginia Lakes Basin 
 The Sawtooth Ridge and Matterhorn Peak

Notes

External links 
 
 official Hoover Wilderness Area website
 Wilderness.net: Hoover Wilderness
 official Humboldt-Toiyabe National Forest website
 National Atlas: Map of Humboldt-Toiyabe National Forest
 Hoover Wilderness - Wilderness Connect

Wilderness areas of California
Humboldt–Toiyabe National Forest
Inyo National Forest
Protected areas of Mono County, California
Sierra Nevada (United States)
Protected areas established in 1964
1964 establishments in California